Finca Élez is a Vino de Pago from Spain. This is the highest category on the quality scale of Spanish wines and means that in addition to having a proven track record of consistent quality, the wines have to be both produced from estate-grown grapes and also have to be processed and aged in a winery (bodega) located on the estate.
This Vino de Pago is located in the municipality of El Bonillo, in the province of Albacete (Castile-La Mancha, Spain) and acquired its status in 2002.

The Estate
Finca Élez, founded by Manuel Manzaneque, has  planted under vines of the following varieties: chardonnay, cabernet sauvignon, merlot, tempranillo and syrah.

The winery is located next to the vineyards at an elevation of 1,080 m above sea level in the Sierra de Alcaraz mountain range.

Climate
The climate is continental (hot, dry summers; cold winters) with marked differences between daytime and nighttime temperatures.

Soils
The soils are mainly clay-sand, with some other elements such as lime, marls and ochre clays.

Production
Approximately 200,000 bottles/year.

References

External links
 http://www.pagofincaelez.com

Wine regions of Spain